The Philippines national football team's 2–0 win against Vietnam in the group stage of the 2010 AFF Championship, also dubbed as the Miracle in Hanoi is a noted match which is widely regarded as the start of the Philippines' resurgence in football in the 2010s. The win resulted to the Philippines' first semifinals qualification in the tournament's history. Prior to the match the Philippines were known for being among the weakest sides in Asian football. The match was held at the Mỹ Đình National Stadium in Hanoi.

Background
The Philippines prior to the 2010s were regarded as one of the weakest national teams in Asia. The Philippines had to qualify for the tournament proper of the 2010 AFF Championship, also known as the Suzuki Cup for sponsorship reasons. Along with Laos, the Philippines clinched the two contested berths for the 2010 AFF Championship in the qualifiers. Ian Araneta's hat trick in a 5–0 win over Timor-Leste was a significant factor in securing the Philippines' qualification to the tournament proper, since they, Laos, and Cambodia were tied in points.

Dan Palami became involved as the national team's manager and main sponsor in December 2009, with the Philippine Football Federation allowing Palami to have autonomy over its management. Palami was in charge of recruiting players and hiring the coach of the team. Des Bulpin was hired as head coach shortly after Palami's entry but Bulpin was replaced by Simon McMenemy. Palami gathered both local-based players and foreigners of Filipino descent alike to form a squad and focused on the team's defense. He also had to fund the team since the only major private sponsor prior to the 2010 AFF Championship is sportwear outfitter Mizuno.

The Philippines' squad for the 2010 AFF Championship had seven players which were part of the national team that played at the 2004 edition of the same tournament. These were Ian Araneta, Aly Borromeo, Emelio Caligdong, Roel Gener, Anton del Rosario, Peter Jaugan and Chris Greatwich.

Pre-match
Entering the group stage, three-time champions Singapore and defending champions and hosts Vietnam were favored to advance to the semifinals. The Philippines started their campaign with a 1–1 draw with Singapore through an injury-time goal from Chris Greatwich. This result ended the Philippines' eleven-match losing streak to Singapore, which dates back to the former's heavy 0–5 loss at the 1972 President's Cup in South Korea. Vietnam routed Myanmar with seven goals, with the opposition only managing to reply with a single goal.

Prior to the match, the Philippines has never won against Vietnam with a record of five defeats and two 2–2 draws since the unification of North and South Vietnam. Philippines head coach Simon McMenemy said that his team would improve on their counterattacking while his Vietnam counterpart Henrique Calisto remark that his team have to overcome the Philippines' defense.

Match details
The match began at 19:30 (UTC+7) before a crowd of 40,000 spectators. Roel Gener started in lieu of Emelio Caligdong and Phil Younghusband experienced a stomachache throughout the game, reportedly due to something he ate during his team's breakfast earlier the same day.

The Philippines was the first team to have a close chance to score a goal in the 18th minute with Vietnamese defenders failing to avert a corner kick made by Phil Younghusband. The ball reached Ian Araneta, who failed to capitalize and made a shot that went outside the post. A minute later, Phạm Thành Lương's attempt was blocked by Neil Etheridge. The Filipino goalkeeper handled the ball outside his penalty area some minutes following that chance, conceding a free kick. Nguyễn Minh Phương's curved shot went past the wall, however, it came wide off the goal. In the 38th minute, Chris Greatwich opened the scoring for the Philippines, who held on for the rest of the first half.

Vietnam made several attempts to equalize in the second half: Nguyễn Vũ Phong failed to score from the edge in the 58th minute, Nguyễn Anh Đức was stopped by Rob Gier and substitute Nguyễn Trọng Hoàng had his attempt saved by Etheridge two minutes after he entered the pitch.

Phil Younghusband scored the Philippines' second goal when he made a low shot on Vietnam's side of the pitch that Dương Hồng Sơn could not keep out.

Results
The Philippines found themselves topping Group B following the conclusion of the second matchday.

Immediately after the match, Vietnam's coach Henrique Calisto refused to make a handshake with his Philippine counterpart Simon McMenemy. Callisto later rebuked the Philippines' tactics as "poor football" and was critical of the Philippines for "putting the bus in front of the goal", remarking that "football is not putting eight players in front of the area with no offensive system". McMenemy on his part was left in disbelief for his team's feat.

After the win, the Philippines had to secure at least a draw against Myanmar to ensure their place in the semifinals, which they managed to do so to finish ahead of Singapore and face Indonesia in the two-legged semifinals. Meanwhile, Vietnam snatched back first place courtesy of wins against Myanmar and Singapore.

Group B final standings

However, the Azkals had to play both of their matches before a hostile crowd at the Gelora Bung Karno Stadium in Jakarta, as they had no available stadium that conforms to AFF standards at the time. Even the Rizal Memorial Stadium was still months away from completing renovation. Unable to withstand that much pressure from Indonesian fans, the Philippines ended their fairytale journey after losing both legs without scoring a single goal.

Knockout stage bracket

Semifinals – Philippines v Indonesia

Indonesia won 2–0 on aggregate.

Media coverage
The match was broadcast live by ABS-CBN. Prior to that match, no Philippines-based firm had rights to broadcast the 2010 AFF Championship in the country. The Azkals' tie with Singapore was not broadcast live in the Philippines. ABS-CBN chairman Eugenio Lopez III personally called then ABS-CBN Sports vice president Peter Musñgi to secure broadcasting rights for ABS-CBN to air live matches of the Philippines at the 2010 AFF Championship on December 5, within the same day that the Philippines–Vietnam match was scheduled. Musñgi negotiated with the tournament's Singapore-based broadcast rights owner. ABS-CBN was also asked if it could potentially cover a potential Azkals match at home if they progress to the semifinals with Musñgi pledging the media firm has the capability. Musñgi managed to secure the rights for free, relying on the fact that it is the first time that a Philippine broadcaster will cover the tournament.

Aftermath

Philippines
The milestone match in Philippine football history would be later be referred to as the Miracle of Hanoi by Filipino fans. The match is widely regarded to have marked the start of a "renaissance" in the state of football in the Philippines. The match was considered as one of the biggest upsets in the AFF Championship's history with the Philippines win over Vietnam being their second one after their win over Timor Leste in the 2004 edition.

The Philippine national football team paid an official courtesy call with the then-President Benigno Aquino III at the Malacañang Palace in Manila who congratulated them for their performance in the championship. The team was also conferred with the Presidential Achievement Award by the Philippine Sportswriters Association (PSA). Team manager Dan Palami was also recognized for his contribution in forming the national team and was named Executive of the Year.

The win attributed to the increase of interest of football in the Philippines and was followed by the Philippines' successful bid to qualify for the 2012 AFC Challenge Cup and the second round of the 2014 FIFA World Cup qualifiers in 2011. Eventually, it culminated into a much greater success, qualifying for the 2019 AFC Asian Cup which was the Philippines' first ever competitive tournament in the country's football history.

The Azkals' win was included in Sports Illustrated top ten association football stories for 2010.

Vietnam and the Philippines were grouped in the following edition of the AFF Championship in 2012. Vietnam lost again to the Philippines but this time by a single goal. Thailand and the Philippines advanced to the semifinals at Vietnam's expense. As for 2020, this is the Philippines' last major win over Vietnam, with the Filipinos defeated in 2014 AFF Championship and 2018 AFF Championship.

Vietnam
The match's outcome created a huge shock on the country, and it slowly marked the end of Vietnam's second golden generation. Even though Vietnam managed to reach the semi-finals, they failed to defend the title, losing to Malaysia 0–2 on aggregate. This led to an eight-year "dark age" of Vietnamese football, culminating in a first-round elimination in 2014 FIFA World Cup qualification, despite a home win over Qatar.

The failure to produce promised performance was further exacerbated by accusation of nepotism and corruption within the national team. At the 2014 AFF Championship, which Vietnam topped their group with a win over the Philippines, the team was suddenly defeated in a shock 2–4 home loss to Malaysia despite winning 2–1 away earlier, and was eliminated. Vietnam was also eliminated in the 2016 AFF Championship and, most humiliatingly, the 2017 SEA Games. Vietnam almost lost a place to qualify for the 2019 AFC Asian Cup, if not for three important draws to Afghanistan and Jordan, and two wins over Cambodia, with Cambodia even managed to beat Afghanistan at home while Vietnam could only get two draws. Mishandling was also another indicating factor leading to Vietnam's deterioration of performance, as seen with over three managers being replaced in just a short number of times.

Finally, only for the successful performance of the youth team in the 2018 AFC U-23 Championship and emergence of new talents also from this competition, Vietnamese football started to reclaim its place, marked the end of eight years in darkness, in which Vietnam won the 2018 AFF Championship, and reached the last eight of the 2019 AFC Asian Cup.

References

2010 AFF Championship
AFF Championship matches
Vietnam national football team matches
Philippines national football team matches
December 2010 sports events in Asia
2010 in Philippine football